Log v Bohinju is a small settlement on the right bank of the Sava Bohinjka River in the Municipality of Bohinj in the Upper Carniola region of Slovenia.

Geography

Pirašica Falls (also slap Peračica and locally Pérošca) is located in the northwest part of Log v Bohinju.

History
Log v Bohinju was part of the village of Lepence until 1997, when it was made a village in its own right.

References

External links

Log v Bohinju at Geopedia

Populated places in the Municipality of Bohinj